The Beechlawn Advance and Retreat is a historic mansion in Columbia, Tennessee, U.S..

History
The house was built as a house for A. W. Warfield in 1853. During the American Civil War of 1861–1865, Warfield served as a Major in the Confederate States Army. His wife remained in the house, and she let Confederate generals John Bell Hood and Nathan Bedford Forrest, and Union general John Schofield use it as army command on November 24, 1864 and December 20, 1864 respectively.

Architectural significance
The house was designed in the Greek Revival architectural style. It has been listed on the National Register of Historic Places since May 14, 1971.

References

National Register of Historic Places in Maury County, Tennessee
Greek Revival architecture in Tennessee
Houses completed in 1855